Leslie is the name of Russian noble family of Scottish origin. Descendants of Alexander Leslie of Auchintoul, who was a Scottish soldier in Swedish and General in Russian service. In 1654 he wrested Smolensk from the Poles and became the Tsar's governor/voivode there. Auchintoul fought for the Montrosians in the English Civil War.  He was the son of William Leslie, third laird of Crichie, a branch of the Balquhain Leslies. He was commander of Russian forces during the Siege of Smolensk (1654), one of the first great events of the Russo-Polish War (1654–67).

Descendants
 John Leslie of Balquhain, son of General Alexander Leslie, was a Scottish cavalry colonel in Russian service killed in the storming of Igolwitz castle on 30 August 1655, he married a daughter of Colonel Crawford in Muscovy, though there are at least three Crawfords with that rank in the Russian service, so it's not entirely clear who is meant.
Family had several generals during Great Northern War, War of the Polish Succession and Russo-Turkish War (1735–1739).
 , (1758—1826) - commander of Smolensk Zemskoe Narodnoe Opolcheniye in 1812.
 Leslie, Yuri Federovich, (? — 1737) — major general, under command of Generalfeldmarschall Peter Lacy in Siege of Danzig (1734).

Notes

References

Russian noble families
Russian families of Scottish origin